N6-adenosine-methyltransferase 70 kDa subunit (METTL3) is an enzyme that in humans is encoded by the METTL3 gene.

This gene encodes the 70 kDa subunit of MT-A which is part of N6-adenosine-methyltransferase. This enzyme is involved in the post-transcriptional methylation of internal adenosine residues in eukaryotic mRNAs, forming N6-methyladenosine (m6A).

References

Further reading